Leroy "Roy" F. Aarons (December 8, 1933 – November 28, 2004) was an American journalist, editor, author, playwright, founder of the National Lesbian and Gay Journalists Association (NLGJA), and founding member of the Robert C. Maynard Institute for Journalism Education. In 2005 he was inducted into the NLGJA Hall of Fame.

Early life

Born in Bronx, New York, on December 8, 1933 to Latvian-Jewish immigrant parents. Leroy F. Aarons Aarons graduated cum laude from Brown University and earned an MS from the Columbia Graduate School of Journalism. He served in the Navy and Naval Reserve, attained the rank of lieutenant, and was a copyeditor at the New Haven Journal-Courier.

At The Washington Post

Aarons worked at the Post for many years. As an editor and a national correspondent, he served as New York bureau chief and later established the paper's first Los Angeles bureau. He covered major events of the 1960s and 1970s such as the assassinations of Martin Luther King Jr. and Robert F. Kennedy, urban riots, and government scandals.

Aarons had a front-row seat when the Pentagon Papers story surfaced. As Los Angeles bureau chief, he covered California-related events in the case, including what work Daniel Ellsberg had been doing for the Rand Corporation and how he managed to remove the Pentagon Papers from Rand headquarters.

The scandal that forced a president to resign was Watergate, and the Post was the paper that broke the story. Because of his role at the paper during the Watergate reporting, Aarons was hired as an accuracy consultant for the Post-centered film about the scandal, All the President's Men.

Work with Robert C. Maynard

In 1981 Aarons met Israeli computer consultant Joshua Boneh at his Jewish Community Center in Washington D.C. "He followed Boneh to Israel" in 1982 where he covered the Lebanon War for Time. The two celebrated their 20th anniversary with a commitment ceremony at the same JCC where they met. Aarons joined the Oakland Tribune, urged by former colleague Robert C. Maynard. Maynard had purchased the declining Tribune and recruited Roy to be its features editor.

In the 1970s Aarons had joined Maynard in founding what would become the Robert C. Maynard Institute for Journalism Education (MIJE). Maynard had been working with a summer program for minority journalists at Columbia University, and he urged Aarons to join its faculty. In 1976, the program moved to the University of California, Berkeley as the Summer Program for Minority Journalists. It later became MIJE, a model program in training and supporting minority journalists.

At the Tribune, Aarons rose to executive editor and then to senior vice president for news, where he worked for greater staff diversity. He led his team to a 1990 Pulitzer Prize for Spot News Photography of the 1989 Loma Prieta earthquake. The following year he retired from journalism.

Activism

In 1989 the American Society of Newspaper Editors (ASNE) asked Aarons to coordinate a survey of gay and lesbian journalists. Responses from 250 print journalists revealed that most were closeted in their newsrooms. An overwhelming majority said coverage of gay issues was "at best mediocre." Fewer than 60 percent had told colleagues about their sexual orientation; fewer than 7 percent said their work environments were good for gays. At ASNE's national convention in 1990, Aarons presented the results and closed his speech by coming out. Four months after his speech, Aarons convened six journalists in his California dining room to launch the National Lesbian and Gay Journalists Association (NLGJA). He was its president until 1997, and remained on the board until his death.

After working for over a year, in Fall 2003, Aarons, Dane S. Claussen, Amy Falkner, Rhonda Gibson, and others relaunched the then-GLBT Interest Group of the Association for Education in Journalism & Mass Communication (AEJMC). Aarons asked Claussen to serve as the first Head, but he could not because he already was to be 2003-4 Head of AEJMC's Mass Communication & Society Division. David Adams and Sue Lafky served as the first Co-Heads, with Claussen as Vice-Head/Program Chair, and Aarons as Secretary. Aarons, then teaching at the University of Southern California, followed that up by persuading the Accrediting Council for Education in Journalism and Mass Communication (ACEJMC) to add sexual orientation content in its curriculum diversity standard.

On its 15th anniversary in 2006, NLGJA established the annual Leroy F. Aarons Scholarship Award for a lesbian, gay, bisexual or transgender student pursuing a journalism career. CNN provided $100,000 to fund the scholarship. The AEJMC LGBTQ Interest Group's Teaching Committee also awards, generally every two years, its Leroy F. Aarons Award for lifetime contributions to university teaching and/or research related to the LGBTQ communities.

Influence in journalism

In the 1970s, Aarons collaborated with Robert Maynard in starting programs to train people of color for journalism careers, then switching to LGBT issues in journalism.

Aarons believed that coverage of the gay community, as with other minorities, required training of journalists. He began to lobby journalism schools to include gay issues in their diversity training. In 1999, as a visiting professor of journalism at the USC Annenberg School for Communication, he founded and directed its Sexual Orientation Issues in the News program. Adapted by universities, the program analyzes how the media has shaped public perception of people and issues since the early 20th century. In 2003, Aarons, Dane S. Claussen, David L. Adams, and several other U.S. journalism professors relaunched the Gay, Lesbian, Bisexual, Transgender Interest Group of the Association for Education in Journalism and Mass Communication. The group biannually presents the Leroy F. Aarons Award for career contributions to media-oriented education and research affecting LGBTQ.

In 1985, Aarons started We the People - The Voice North Bay's LGBT Community, which was a monthly newspaper for 27 years.

Music and opera

Aarons had a love of music and often invited colleagues and friends to his home in California for sing-along parties. In the last decade of his career, Aarons turned to opera, writing the libretto for Monticello.  Composed by Glenn Paxton, Monticello portrays the love affair between Thomas Jefferson and Sally Hemings. L. A. Theatre Works produced the original work in 2000.

After the attacks of Sep 11, 2001, Aarons wrote the libretto for Sara's Diary, 9/11, an opera composed by his collaborator on Monticello, Glenn Paxton. A song cycle, this work is a fictional account of a pregnant woman, who, after her husband dies in the tragedy, experiences deeply mixed emotions. It premiered at the Spreckels Performing Arts Center on Sep 8, 2003 in commemoration of the unprecedented attacks.

Prayers for Bobby

In 1989 Aarons read a newspaper article about the suicide of a young gay man, Bobby Griffith, and its effects on his mother. After he left daily journalism in 1991, he researched the story in depth. The result was his first book, published by HarperCollins in 1995, Prayers for Bobby: A Mother's Coming to Terms with the Suicide of Her Gay Son. He did not see it presented to a large viewership before he died. Prayers for Bobby premiered on January 24, 2009, as a Lifetime TV film starring Sigourney Weaver in her first made-for-television film.

Other works

In 1991 Aarons revisited the Pentagon Papers case, co-authoring a docudrama with Geoffrey Cowan, Top Secret: The Battle for the Pentagon Papers . That year it aired on National Public Radio, performed by Ed Asner and Marsha Mason. The play won the Corporation for Public Broadcasting's Gold Award for best live entertainment program on public radio. Top Secret still tours colleges nationwide as a production of LA Theatre Works.

Death

On November 28, 2004, Leroy Aarons died of cancer. He was 70 years old.

At the time of his death, Aarons was working on another play, Night Nurse, about South Africa's Truth and Reconciliation Commission, for which he and his life partner of 24 years, Joshua Boneh,  had spent a month in South Africa doing research. An actor and producer in Berkeley, California performed it as a work-in-progress in Mill Valley. The play has not yet been completed.

Notes

External links
 Roy Aarons Official Website
 
 Prayers for Bobby
 Top Secret: Battle for the Pentagon Papers 
 Monticello 
 ASNE
 NLGJA
 Maynard Institute
 PFLAG
 Annenberg School for Communication
 Annenberg Sexual Orientation Issues in the News Program
 NLGJA press release announcing Aarons' death
 Maynard Institute announcement of Aarons' death
 NPR tribute to Aarons
 NLGJA Hall of Fame Bio

1933 births
2004 deaths
American editors
Deaths from cancer in New York (state)
American LGBT dramatists and playwrights
American LGBT journalists
Writers from the Bronx
United States Navy officers
Gay dramatists and playwrights
Gay journalists
20th-century American dramatists and playwrights
21st-century American dramatists and playwrights
American male dramatists and playwrights
Gay Jews
LGBT people from New York (state)
Columbia University Graduate School of Journalism alumni
20th-century American male writers
21st-century American male writers
20th-century American non-fiction writers
21st-century American non-fiction writers
American male non-fiction writers
American gay writers
American people of Latvian-Jewish descent
American LGBT military personnel
Gay military personnel
Jewish American military personnel
Brown University alumni
20th-century American Jews
21st-century American Jews
20th-century American LGBT people
21st-century American LGBT people